Burgerveen is a village in the western Netherlands. It is located in the municipality of Haarlemmermeer, North Holland, about halfway between Amsterdam and The Hague.

The current village was first mentioned in 1867 as Burgerveen. It is named after the village which was lost in the Haarlemmermeer which was named after the burgrave of Leiden. The old village was abandoned by 1417, and lost in the lake shortly after 1613.

Born in Burgerveen 
 Hendrikus Colijn (1869–1944), twice prime minister of the Netherlands.

Gallery

References

Populated places in North Holland
Haarlemmermeer